Master-General of the Ordnance is a role in the British Army. It may also refer to:

 Master-General of the Ordnance (India)
 Master-General of the Ordnance (Ireland)
 Master-General of the Ordnance (Sri Lanka)
 Master-General of the Ordnance (Sweden)